Linda Tirado is an American author, freelance photographer and political activist. Her memoir Hand to Mouth: Living in Bootstrap America is about her life as a member of the working class.  She has also written articles for The Guardian, The Daily Beast and other online periodicals. In 2014, she was included in the BBC's 100 Women.

Tirado first came to public attention in October 2013 when a comment she made about living in poverty on a Gawker Media website, Killer Martinis, went viral; she later expanded it into her book. Shortly afterwards, an article in the Houston Press brought to light that she had come from a comfortable background where she had been a boarding student at the Cranbrook Schools in Michigan and worked as a political campaign consultant between 2004 and 2010. The writer attacked Tirado for purveying poverty porn, describing poverty through negative stereotypes those who have never experienced it would expect to read about. Tirado had disclosed this herself on a GoFundMe page she was running; while she described her essay as
"impressionistic" she made public records showing that for several years she and her family had received Medicaid, welfare and WIC.

In May 2020, she was injured in her left eye while she was covering the George Floyd protests in Minneapolis–Saint Paul. Tirado believed the injury was caused by a rubber bullet fired by the police, though it was later reported to be a sponge bullet. Following surgery, the prognosis was that she would be blind in that eye. She returned to work the following day. Tirado filed suit against the police around June 14, 2020. On May 26, 2022, in the protest aftermath, the Minneapolis City Council agreed to a $600,000 settlement.

In August 2020, Tirado received the John Aubuchon Press Freedom Award from the National Press Club.

See also
Mackenzie Fierceton, Penn student who withdrew from a Rhodes scholarship over allegations that she had exaggerated her background as a foster child and downplayed her affluent, privately-educated childhood.

References

External links
 
 

21st-century American non-fiction writers
21st-century American women writers
American women non-fiction writers
BBC 100 Women
Living people
Year of birth missing (living people)
Place of birth missing (living people)
American photojournalists
21st-century American photographers
21st-century American women photographers
Women photojournalists